Jaddy Simai Jaddy (born 30 June 1963) is a Tanzanian CCM politician and Member of Parliament for Mkwajuni constituency since 2010.

References

1963 births
Living people
Chama Cha Mapinduzi MPs
Tanzanian MPs 2010–2015
Mkwajuni Secondary School alumni
Taras Shevchenko National University of Kyiv alumni